Festuca elmeri is a species of grass known by the common names coast fescue and Elmer's fescue. It is a bunchgrass native to the US states of California and Oregon, where it often grows in wet, shady areas in coastal counties.

Description
This fescue grows in thin bunches with erect stems reaching up to one meter in height. The leaves are somewhat hairy and 10 to 40 centimeters long. The drooping inflorescence holds spikelets which are each about a centimeter long and have light-colored, hairlike awns.

External links
Jepson Manual Treatment
USDA Plants Profile 
Grass Manual Treatment
Photo gallery

elmeri
Bunchgrasses of North America
Native grasses of California
Grasses of the United States
Flora of California
Flora of Oregon
Flora of the Klamath Mountains
Natural history of the California chaparral and woodlands
Natural history of the California Coast Ranges
Natural history of the San Francisco Bay Area
Taxa named by Elmer Drew Merrill
Flora without expected TNC conservation status